In 2015, the  will participate in the Currie Cup and the Vodacom Cup competitions. The  team will also play in the 2015 Under-21 Provincial Championship Group A and the  team in the 2015 Under-19 Provincial Championship Group A. As part of the Southern Kings franchise, a number of players will also participate in friendlies for this franchise.

Chronological list of events

 5 November 2014: The squad for the 2015 season is revealed.
 14 November 2014: Winger Paul Perez's contract is terminated with immediate effect after an incident of absenteeism.
 17 November 2014:  fly-half Tony Jantjies joins the Kings ahead of the 2015 season, defensive coach Michael Horak joins Durban-based side the  prior to the 2015 Super Rugby season. and the  confirm that Paul Perez joined them on a trial basis.
 29 December 2014: Forwards coach Shaun Sowerby also leaves the Kings' coaching staff, returning to France (where he spent ten years as a player) to join  as a forwards coach.
 15 January 2015: The Kings officially confirm that Omar Mouneimne rejoined the side as defensive coach. He had a previous spell with the side before following Alan Solomons to Edinburgh in 2013. James Fleming, who previously had a spell at the Kings as a physiotherapist before joining the Sharks for 2014, also returns to the Kings in his new role of Head of High Performance.
 19 January 2015: The Eastern Province Kings Academy hand a scholarship to Craven Week and South African Schools prop Lupumlo Mguca to finish his schooling at Burnside High School in Christchurch, New Zealand.
 30 January 2015: A 38-man squad for the 2015 Vodacom Cup is revealed. The Kings also confirm that Dylon Frylinck and Cornell Hess were offered contracts for the duration of the Vodacom Cup competition.
 2 February 2015:  wingers Sylvian Mahuza and Luther Obi are training with the EP Kings.
 8 February 2015: Eastern Province and South African Schools fly-half Curwin Bosch is named the 2014 Craven Week Player of the Tournament at the annual South African Rugby Union awards ceremony.
 25 February 2015: Just over a month after confirming his appointment, the EP Kings announce that defensive coach Omar Mouneimne is leaving them again to take up a consultancy role at French Top 14 side .
 6 March 2015: The  beat the Eastern Province Kings 31–30 in a pre-season trial match in Port Elizabeth. The Kings scored four tries through Hansie Graaff, George Whitehead, Kevin Luiters and Dylon Frylinck, with Scott van Breda and Tony Jantjies each converting one of those tries. George Whitehead also kicked two penalties in the match.
 14 March 2015: The Eastern Province Kings beat the  13–8 in a pre-season trial match. Eital Bredenkamp scored the Kings' only try of the match, with Gary van Aswegen converting the try and kicking two penalties.
 25 March 2015: Three  players are named in an extended South Africa Under-20 training group as part of their preparation for the 2015 World Rugby Under 20 Championship – fullback Malcolm Jaer and flankers Tyler Paul and CJ Velleman.
 27 March 2015: Prop Charl du Plessis announces his retirement from rugby following medical advice regarding persistent back problems.
 9 June 2015: Defense coach Brent Janse van Rensburg is appointed the new head coach of the Eastern Province Kings for the 2015 Currie Cup Premier Division.
 24 June 2015: Fly-half Tony Jantjies' contract is terminated with immediate effect following a breach of team protocol.
 21 July 2015: Former head coach and the current kicking and specialist skills coach, Carlos Spencer, leaves the EP Kings after being involved with the side since December 2013.
 24 July 2015: Grey High School players Curwin Bosch (fly-half) and Khwezi Mafu (loose forward) are both named in the 2015 South African Schools squad to play internationals against Wales, France and England, while Grey lock Kamva Dilima is named in the South African Schools 'A' squad to play against Italy, England and Wales, alongside Hoërskool Framesby players André Lategan (hooker) and Riaan van Rensburg (fullback) and HTS Daniel Pienaar centre Heino Bezuidenhout.
 17 August 2015: The Kings announced a three-year apparel sponsorship deal with BLK, starting in 2016. The deal would see BLK supply the kit for the Eastern Province Kings Currie Cup side, as well as the Southern Kings Super Rugby side.

Players

Player list

The following players were named in a pre-season training squad:

Vodacom Cup squad

The following players were included in their 2015 Vodacom Cup squad:

Player movements

In

Out

Vodacom Cup

Log

Round-by-round

Fixtures & Results

Player Statistics

The following table shows players statistics for the 2015 Vodacom Cup season:

 Albé de Swardt, Malcolm Jaer, Shaun McDonald, Vukile Sofisa, Jan Uys and CJ Velleman were named in the 2015 Vodacom Cup squad, but never included in a matchday 22.

Player Appearances

The following players appeared for the Eastern Province Kings during the 2015 Vodacom Cup:

 Albé de Swardt, Malcolm Jaer, Shaun McDonald, Vukile Sofisa, Jan Uys and CJ Velleman were named in the 2015 Vodacom Cup squad, but never included in a matchday 22.

Currie Cup

Log

Round-by-round

Fixtures & Results

Player Appearances

The player appearance record in the 2015 Currie Cup Premier Division is as follows:

Under-21 Provincial Championship

Log

The final league standings for the 2015 Under-21 Provincial Championship Group A were:

Round-by-round

Fixtures & Results

Player Record

The player record in the 2015 Under-21 Provincial Championship Group A is as follows:

Under-19 Provincial Championship

The final league standings for the 2015 Under-19 Provincial Championship Group A were:

Round-by-round

Matches

Player Record

The player record in the 2015 Under-19 Provincial Championship Group A is as follows:

Varsity Rugby

The following players were included in the Varsity Rugby squads:

Youth weeks

The Eastern Province Rugby Union announced their squads for the 2015 Under-18 Craven Week, the 2015 Under-18 Academy Week and the 2015 Under-16 Grant Khomo Week tournaments on 20 May 2015:

Under-18 Craven Week

The 2015 Under-18 Craven Week competition was held between 13 and 18 July 2015 in Stellenbosch. Eastern Province Rugby Union entered two sides – Eastern Province U18 and Eastern Province Country Districts U18.

Under-18 Academy Week

The 2015 Under-18 Academy Week competition was held between 6 and 9 July 2015 in Vanderbijlpark. Eastern Province Rugby Union entered two sides – Eastern Province U18 and Eastern Province Country Districts U18.

Under-16 Grant Khomo Week

The 2015 Under-16 Grant Khomo Week competition was held between 6 and 9 July 2015 in Oudtshoorn.

Under-13 Craven Week

The 2015 Under-13 Craven Week competition was held between 29 June and 3 July 2014 in White River.

Under-18 LSEN Week

The 2015 Under-18 LSEN Week (for Learners with Special Educational Needs) competition was held between 29 June and 2 July 2015 in Worcester.

See also

 Eastern Province Elephants
 Southern Kings
 2015 Vodacom Cup
 2015 Currie Cup Premier Division
 2015 Under-21 Provincial Championship Group A
 2015 Under-19 Provincial Championship Group A

Notes

References

2015
2015 Currie Cup
2015 in South African rugby union